Obin Station is a station on the Gyeongui-Jungang Line in South Korea.

External links 

 Station information from Korail

Seoul Metropolitan Subway stations
Railway stations opened in 2010
Metro stations in Yangpyeong County
Yangpyeong County